The Order "For Military Merit" is a military decoration of the Russian Federation established by presidential decree № 442 of March 2, 1994 to reward military excellence.  Its statute was amended three times, first on January 6, 1999 by decree № 19, then on September 7, 2010 by decree № 1099 which modernised the entire Russian awards system and finally on December 16, 2011 by Presidential Decree № 1631.

Award statute
The Order "For Military Merit" is awarded to military personnel for exemplary performance of military duties, for high combat readiness in ensuring Russia's defence; for high personal performance in career and vocational training, for courage and dedication displayed during the performance of military duties in the course of combat or combat-training objectives; for bravery and courage displayed in the performance of military duties; for merit in strengthening military cooperation with friendly nations.

The intended recipient and the person recommending the award must both have a minimum of 20 years of service.

The Order "For Military Merit" may be awarded to employees of the military–industrial complex of the Russian Federation, of scientific and research organizations or government agencies: for services in design, manufacture and commissioning of modern military equipment and weapons; for personal contributions to national defence policies, development of military science, in strengthening national defence and in promoting interstate military-technical cooperation.

The Order may also be awarded to foreign nationals from among the members of the armed forces of allied foreign countries: for merit in strengthening military cooperation with Russia and organising joint military manoeuvres during military exercises.

The Order "For Military Merit" is worn on the left side of the chest and when in the presence of other Orders and medals of the Russian Federation, is located immediately after the Order of Courage.  A rosette in the colours of the ribbon of the Order may be worn on civilian clothing.

Award description
The four diagonal points of the star being enamelled in the national colours of Russia, white, blue and red. The obverse has a central red enamelled medallion with the silver state emblem of Russia in the center. The medallion is surrounded by a silver band with a relief laurel wreath on the lower half and the relief inscription "FOR MILITARY MERIT" following its outer circumference in the upper half. The otherwise plain reverse bears the award serial number at the bottom.

Notable recipients (partial list)
The individuals below were recipients of the Order "For Military Merit".

Cosmonaut, Major General Vladimir Vasiliyevich Kovalyonok
Cosmonaut, Colonel Gennadi Mikhailovich Manakov
Army General Nikolai Platonovich Patrushev
Admiral of the Fleet Vladimir Vasilyevich Masorin
Marshal of the Soviet Union Viktor Georgiyevich Kulikov
Admiral, former Baltic Fleet commander Vladimir Grigor'evich Yegorov
Colonel General Gennady Nikolayevich Troshev
Army General Viktor Germanovich Kazantsev
Army General Yury Nikolayevich Baluyevsky
Fleet Admiral Vladimir Ivanovich Kuroyedov
Fleet Admiral Feliks Nikolayevich Gromov
Marshal of the Russian Federation Igor Sergeyev
Army General Alexander Ivanovich Baranov
Army General Nikolai Dmitrievich Kovalyov
Army General Alexander Vasilyevich Bortnikov
Army General Valentin Vladimirovich Korabelnikov
Admiral Nikolai Mikhailovich Maksimov
Admiral Aleksandr Mikhailovich Nosatov
Admiral Vladimir Sergeyevich Vysotskiy
Army General Vladimir Magomedovich Semyonov
Colonel General Alexander Nikolayevich Zelin
Colonel General Anatoliy Alekseevich Nogovitsyn
Army General Nikolai Yegorovich Makarov
Colonel Yunus-bek Bamatgireyevich Yevkurov
Rear Admiral Anatoly Ivanovich Lipinsky
Rear Admiral Sergei Mikhailovich Pinchuk
Army General Anatoly Mikhaïlovich Kornukov
Colonel General Arkady Viktotovich Bakhin

See also
Awards and decorations of the Russian Federation
Order of Military Merit (Canada)
Order of Military Merit (Korea)
Order of Military Merit (Bulgaria)
Order of Military Merit (Dominican Republic)
Order of Military Merit (France)

References

External links
The Commission on State Awards to the President of the Russian Federation
Web site of the President of the Russian Federation
The Russian Gazette

Military awards and decorations of Russia
Orders, decorations, and medals of Russia
Russian awards
Awards established in 1994
1994 establishments in Russia